Dirch Hartvig Passer (18 May 1926 – 3 September 1980) was a celebrated Danish actor. He was greatly renowned for his improvisational skills and, with a filmography comprising 90 movies, one of Denmark's most prolific actors. His life is depicted in the Danish semi-biographical film A Funny Man (2011, Danish title Dirch) directed by Martin Zandvliet.

Life 
When he was young, Passer was very shy, but had an ambition to become an actor. Instead, he conformed to his father's wishes by attending the J. Lauritzen sea training school near Svendborg in 1944. But since he had persistent problems with seasickness, he later attended the drama school De frederiksbergske teatres Elevskole.

During the 1950s he formed a duo with his colleague and friend Kjeld Petersen. Their revue sketches, based upon the contrast between Petersen's mixture of joviality and desperate anger and Passer's deadpan responses, are still considered classics by the public. The sudden death of Kjeld Petersen in 1962 led Passer to avoid revues for five years, but he built up an individual reputation and in 1967 he returned to the revue gaining new victories. Many thin jokes in the scripts were greatly improved by his performance. In particular, his many amiable eccentrics and "nature experts" together with his sketch roles as a baby and as a nonsense "Russian"-speaking clown made him famous. From his later years must be mentioned an almost silent sketch in which he portrays a man's vain attempt to stop smoking (also shown in West German TV). It was told that he could speak any language, however he wouldn't understand any of it, which was one of his good qualities.

In his life, Dirch Passer wanted to play more serious roles instead of remaining in comedy. However, his image as a comedian was so solid that his attempt to break into serious acting proved to be unsuccessful.

Career 
He was often referred to as a loud actor in spite of the fact that under-acting was responsible for much of his force. A Danish critic, Jens Kistrup, once said that one of the secrets behind the comedy of Passer was its combination of elements that are normally regarded as incompatible. He possessed noisiness and discretion, loudness and quietness, boundlessness and complete control, craziness and softness – all this combined with a special intimacy with the audience.  Among the inspirations he mentioned Joe E. Brown but he was also known for his admiration of the British comedian Tommy Cooper. In his films, which were of very mixed quality, he often played kind and somewhat crazy "Everymen" or antiheroes. Among his best movie roles were stage roles transferred to film; here must be mentioned the hero in Charley's Aunt (1959), Celestin-Floridor in Frøken Nitouche (1963) and Leopold in Summer in Tyrol (i.e. The White Horse Inn, 1964).

He was so popular with the audience that they loved anything he said or did.  I remember one performance at Circusrevyen where he lumbered up to the centerstage mic and just stood there for 30 seconds, silent. (30 seconds is a long time in this scenario!)  Then, he took a deep, noisy breath and said: "Hrmpff."  The audience roared with laughter.  After that, the show finally went on.

Numerous Danish actors see him as a role model. In day-to-day life he was quite shy in behaviour, somewhat the opposite of his theatrical appearances.

Death 

Selected filmography 

  (1947) – Publikum (uncredited)
 Stjerneskud (1947) – Hendes hårdtslående ven
 Lykke på rejsen (1947) – Statist
 Den opvakte jomfru (1950) – Sømand i 1520
 Som sendt fra himlen (1951) – Soldat
 Dorte (1951) – Amerikaner
 Vi arme syndere (1952) – Værtshusgæst
 Vejrhanen (1952) – Ekspeditionssekretær i Kirkeministeriet
 Rekrut 67, Petersen (1952) – Lillebilchauffør Larsen
 Drömsemester (1952) – Mogens Jensen
 Solstik (1953) – Politimanden
 Ved kongelunden... (1953) – Konduktør Svendsen
 Sju svarta be-hå (1954) – Jens Nielsen
 I kongens klæ'r (1954) – Søren Rask – rekrut 66
 Sju svarta be-hå (1954)
  (1954)
 Far och flyg (1955) – Peder
 Det var paa Rundetaarn (1955) – Hans Ramløse, musiker
 Hvad vil De ha'? (1956) – Jansen
 Den store gavtyv (1956) – K.M.M. Mathisen
 Færgekroen (1956) – Erik Hansen
 Tag til marked i Fjordby (1957) – 'Lange' Emil Andersen
  (1957, Short)
 Krudt og klunker (1958) – Fotograf
 Styrmand Karlsen (1958) – Valdemar Bøgelund
 Pigen og vandpytten (1958) – Fabrikant Munk
 Møde ved midnat (1958, TV Short) – Mr. Fox
  (1958, Short)
 Poeten og Lillemor (1959) – Bageren
 Onkel Bill fra New York (1959) – Hans Høj
 Soldaterkammerater rykker ud (1959) – Vagtsoldat
 Charles' tante (1959) – Grev Ditlev Lensby
 Vi er allesammen tossede (1959) – Sporvognskonduktør Knudsen
 TV te' vands (1959, TV Movie) – Chef
 Poeten og Lillemor og Lotte (1960) – The baker
 Elefanter på loftet (1960) – Dennis
 Baronessen fra benzintanken (1960) – Hans Høy
 Sømand i knibe (1960) – Freddy
 Summer and Sinners (1960) – Kansas Joe
 Skibet er ladet med (1960) – Guvernør Alfond d. 1 / Alfond d. 2
 Panik i paradis (1960) – Greven
 Forelsket i København (1960) – Kunstmaler Kobolski
 Reptilicus (1961) – Petersen
 Peters baby (1961) – William Thorsen
 Poeten og Lillemor i forårshumør (1961) – Bageren
 Støv på hjernen (1961) – Alf Thomsen
 Gøngehøvdingen (1961) – Ib
 Lykkens musikanter (1962) – Elevatorfører Gogol
 Han, Hun, Dirch og Dario (1962) – Eigil Hansen
 Det tossede paradis (1962) – Angelus Bukke
 Sømænd og svigermødre (1962) – Kanusti Mogensen
  (1962, Short)
 Det støver stadig (1962) – Alf Thomsen
 Oskar (1962) – Martin Kristiansen
 Svinedrengen og prinsessen på ærten (1962) – (voice)
 Venus fra Vestø (1962) – Ditlev Egede-Schack
 Pigen og pressefotografen (1963) – Bastian
 Vi har det jo dejligt (1963) – Thorvald Madsen
 Hvis lille pige er du? (1963) – Hans
 Frøken Nitouche (1963) – Floridor / Celestin
 Bussen (1963) – Buschauffør Martin
 Tre piger i Paris (1963) – Kok Harald Mikkelsen
 Støv for alle pengene (1963) – Alf Thomsen
 Majorens oppasser (1964) – Thomas Edison Hansen
 Sommer i Tyrol (1964) – Leopold Ulrik Joackim Brantmeyer
 Blåjackor (1964) – Sam
 Don Olsen kommer til byen (1964) – Thorsen
 Här kommer bärsärkarna (1965) – Garm
 Passer passer piger (1965) – Alf Thomsen
 Flådens friske fyre (1965) – Valdemar Jensen
 Pigen og millionæren (1965) – Jens Møller
 Jag – en älskare (1966) – Mortensen
 Der var engang (1966) – Kasper Røghat
 Slap af, Frede! (1966) – Fettucino
 Pigen og greven (1966) – Andreas Lillelys
 Copenhagen Design (1967, TV Movie)
 Elsk... din næste! (1967) – Olaf
 Cirkusrevyen 67 (1967)
 Onkel Joakims hemmelighed (1967) – Fyrst Fingernem (uncredited)
 Mig og min lillebror (1967) – Søren Severinsen
 Soldaterkammerater på bjørnetjeneste (1968) – Vagtkommandør 419 (uncredited)
 Mig og min lillebror og storsmuglerne (1968) – Søren Severinsen
 Min søsters børn vælter byen (1968) – Dr. Mogensen
 Dyrlægens plejebørn (1968) – Dyrlæge Linsager
 Musikken var af Kai Normann Andersen (1968, TV Movie)
 Sjov i gaden (1969) – Peter Jensen
 Pigen fra Egborg (1969) – John Søgaard
 Mig og min lillebror og Bølle (1969) – Søren Severinsen
 Kyrkoherden (1970) – Bartolomeus
 Amour (1970) – Blikkenslager
 Nøglen til paradis (1970) – Gudmund (præst og rejsearrangør)
 Præriens skrappe drenge (1970) – Biggy
 Hurra for de blå husarer (1970) – Spjellerup
 Den Gyldenblonde fortæller (1970, TV Movie)
 Hvor er liget, Møller? (1971) – Vilhelm Hårlung
 Guld til præriens skrappe drenge (1971) – Biggy
 Min søsters børn, når de er værst (1971) – Viggo
 Takt og tone i himmelsengen (1972) – Grev Axel von Hasteen
 Lenin, din gavtyv (1972) – General Ludendorff
 Solstik på badehotellet (1973) – Doktor Grå
 Mig og mafiaen (1973) – Victor 'Viffer' Hansen
 Mafiaen – det er osse mig! (1974) – Victor 'Viffer' Hansen
 Dirch (1974, TV Movie) – Himself / Babyen 
 Piger i trøjen (1975) – Oversergent Vasby
 Spøgelsestoget (1976) – Theodor 'Teddy' T. Thönder
 Piger i trøjen 2 (1976) – Vasby
 Alt på et bræt (1977) – Alfred Emanuelsen
 Piger til søs (1977) – Seniorsergent Vasby
 Fængslende feriedage (1978) – Fængselsinspektør Frost

References

External links 

 
 Who was Dirch Passer? article at Eurochannel

1926 births
1980 deaths
20th-century comedians
20th-century Danish male actors
Best Actor Bodil Award winners
Bodil Honorary Award recipients
Danish male comedians
Danish male actors
Danish male film actors
Danish people of Dutch descent
Deaths onstage
Male actors from Copenhagen